The Untameable is a 1923 American silent drama film directed by Herbert Blaché and starring Gladys Walton, Malcolm McGregor and John St. Polis. It is based on the 1907 novel The White Cat by Gelett Burgess.

Synopsis
Chester Arnold becomes concerned that his fiancée Joy Fielding is developing a split personality, often believing she is a mean and vampish woman called Edna. He comes to realize that she is being hypnotised by her physician Doctor Copin, who schemes to get his hands on her money.

Cast
 Gladys Walton as 	Edna Fielding / Joy Fielding
 Malcolm McGregor as Chester Arnold
 John St. Polis as Dr. Copin 
 Etta Lee as Ah Moy

References

Bibliography
 Connelly, Robert B. The Silents: Silent Feature Films, 1910-36, Volume 40, Issue 2. December Press, 1998.
 Munden, Kenneth White. The American Film Institute Catalog of Motion Pictures Produced in the United States, Part 1. University of California Press, 1997.

External links
 

1923 films
1923 drama films
1920s English-language films
American silent feature films
Silent American drama films
Films directed by Herbert Blaché
American black-and-white films
Universal Pictures films
1920s American films
English-language drama films